{{Infobox film
| image          = Shrek 2 poster.jpg
| caption        = Theatrical release poster
| alt            = 
| director       = 
| producer       = 
| screenplay     = 
| story          = Andrew Adamson
| based_on       = 
| starring       = 
| music          = Harry Gregson-Williams
| editing        = 
| production_companies = 
| distributor    = DreamWorks Pictures
| released       = 
| runtime        = 92 minutes<ref>{{cite web |url= https://www.bbfc.co.uk/release/shrek-2-q29sbgvjdglvbjpwwc0zndc3odc |title=Shrek 2' (PG) |work=British Board of Film Classification |date=May 26, 2004 |access-date=September 4, 2014 |archive-date=February 7, 2015 |archive-url=https://web.archive.org/web/20150207121752/http://bbfc.co.uk/releases/shrek-2-2004-1 |url-status=live }}</ref>
| country        = United States
| language       = English
| budget         = $150 million
| gross          = $935.2 million
}}Shrek 2 is a 2004 American computer-animated comedy film loosely based on the 1990 children's picture book Shrek! by William Steig. Directed by Andrew Adamson, Kelly Asbury, and Conrad Vernon (in Vernon's feature directorial debut) from a screenplay by Adamson, Joe Stillman, J. David Stem, and David N. Weiss, it is the sequel to Shrek (2001) and the second installment in the Shrek film series. The film stars Mike Myers, Eddie Murphy and Cameron Diaz, who reprise their respective voice roles of Shrek, Donkey, and Fiona. They are joined by new characters voiced by Antonio Banderas, Julie Andrews, John Cleese, Rupert Everett, and Jennifer Saunders. Shrek 2 takes place following the events of the first film, with Shrek and Donkey meeting Fiona's parents as her zealous Fairy Godmother, who wants Fiona to marry her son Prince Charming, plots to destroy Shrek and Fiona's marriage. Shrek and Donkey team up with a swashbuckling cat named Puss in Boots to foil her plans.

Development began in 2001, and following disagreements with producers, the first film's screenwriters Ted Elliott and Terry Rossio were replaced with Adamson. The story was inspired by Guess Who's Coming to Dinner (1967), and new animation tools were utilized to improve the visual appearance of each character, particularly Puss in Boots. The lead actors also received a significant bump in salary to $10 million, which at the time was among the highest contracts in their respective careers. Like its predecessor, Shrek 2 also parodies other films based on fairy tales and features references to American popular culture.Shrek 2 premiered at the 2004 Cannes Film Festival on May 15, 2004, where it competed for the Palme d'Or, and it was released in theaters on May 19, by DreamWorks Pictures. Met with highly favorable reviews like its predecessor, the film grossed $935.2 million worldwide. It scored the second-largest three-day opening weekend in United States history and the largest opening for an animated film at the time of its release. It went on to become the highest-grossing film of 2004. Shrek 2 is also DreamWorks Animation's highest-grossing film to date and the highest-grossing film released by DreamWorks Pictures, and it held the title of being the highest-grossing animated film of all time worldwide until Toy Story 3 surpassed it in 2010. The film received two Academy Award nominations for Best Animated Feature and Best Original Song, and its associated soundtrack charted in the Top 10 on the US Billboard 200. A sequel, Shrek the Third, was released in May 2007.

Plot

Newlyweds Shrek and Princess Fiona return from their honeymoon to find they have been invited by Fiona's parents to a royal ball to celebrate their marriage. Shrek initially refuses to attend, but Fiona convinces him, and along with Donkey, they travel to the kingdom of Far Far Away. They meet Fiona's parents, King Harold and Queen Lillian, who are shocked to see the ogres, with Harold particularly repulsed. At dinner, Shrek and Harold get into a heated argument, and Fiona, disgusted at their behavior, locks herself away in her room. Shrek worries that he is losing Fiona, particularly after finding her childhood diary and reading that she was once infatuated with Prince Charming.

Harold is secretly reprimanded by the Fairy Godmother, as her son, Prince Charming, was to marry Fiona in exchange for Harold's own happy ending. She orders him to get rid of Shrek, so Harold arranges for Puss in Boots to assassinate him under the guise of a hunting trip. Unable to defeat Shrek, Puss reveals that he was paid by Harold and offers to be an ally. Shrek, Donkey, and Puss sneak into the Fairy Godmother's factory and steal a "Happily Ever After" potion that Shrek thinks will make him good enough for Fiona. Shrek and Donkey both drink the potion but nothing happens. Shrek laments before he and Donkey both suddenly fall asleep. Meanwhile, in Far Far Away, Fiona prepares to find Shrek so they can return home, but she too falls asleep.

The following morning, the potion transforms Shrek and Fiona into humans, and Donkey into a white stallion. In order to make the change permanent, Shrek must kiss Fiona by midnight. Shrek, Donkey, and Puss return to the castle. However, the Fairy Godmother, having discovered the theft, has sent Charming to pose as Shrek and win Fiona's love. At the Fairy Godmother's urging, Shrek leaves the castle, believing that the best way to make Fiona happy is to let her go.

Fiona does not reciprocate Charming's advances, so to ensure she falls in love with Charming, the Fairy Godmother gives Harold a love potion to put into Fiona's tea. This exchange is overheard by Shrek, Donkey, and Puss, who are arrested by the royal knights after Donkey inadvertently exposes them. While the royal ball begins, friendly fairy-tale creatures rescue the trio from jail, and they storm the castle with the help of a monstrous living gingerbread man created by the Muffin Man.

Shrek fails to prevent Charming from kissing Fiona, but instead of falling in love, Fiona knocks him out; Harold reveals that he swapped Fiona's tea that has the love potion with another tea. The now-enraged Fairy Godmother tries to kill Shrek with her magic wand, but Harold jumps in front of it; the spell ricochets off his armor and disintegrates her. With the Fairy Godmother gone, Harold reverts into the Frog Prince. Harold apologizes, admitting to using the "Happily Ever After" potion years earlier to gain Lillian's love, and approves Shrek and Fiona's marriage. Lillian assures Harold that she still loves him. As the clock strikes midnight, Fiona rejects Shrek's offer to remain human, and they revert into ogres, while Donkey also returns to normal. In the mid-credits scene, Dragon, who had previously married Donkey, reveals that they now have several dragon-donkey hybrid babies.

Voice cast

 Mike Myers as Shrek
 Eddie Murphy as Donkey
 Cameron Diaz as Princess Fiona
 Julie Andrews as Queen Lillian
 Antonio Banderas as Puss in Boots
 John Cleese as King Harold
 Rupert Everett as Prince Charming
 Jennifer Saunders as Fairy Godmother
 Joan Rivers as Red Carpet Announcer
Kate Thornton provides the voice for the UK version
 Larry King as Doris the Ugly Stepsister
Jonathan Ross provides the voice for the UK version
 Aron Warner as Big Bad Wolf
 Cody Cameron as:
 Pinocchio
 The Three Little Pigs
 Christopher Knights and Simon J. Smith as Three Blind Mice
 Conrad Vernon as:
 Gingy
 Muffin Man
 Mongo
 Cedric
 Announcer
 Chris Miller as Magic Mirror
 Mark Moseley as Dresser
 Kelly Cooney as Fast Food Clerk
 Kelly Asbury as:
 Page
 Elf
 Nobleman
 Nobleman's son
 Andrew Adamson as Captain of the Guard

 Cameos
Joan Rivers' cameo as herself marked the first time that a real person had been represented on screen by the Shrek animation team. Her part (though retaining her visual representation) was redubbed by presenter Kate Thornton for the United Kingdom release.
Simon Cowell appears as himself on Far Far Away Idol, a parody of American Idol, on the DVD special features and just before the credits on the U.S. VHS edition (see Home Media).

Production
In 2001, soon after the original Shrek proved to be a hit, Mike Myers, Eddie Murphy, and Cameron Diaz negotiated an upfront payment of $10 million each for voicing a sequel to the film. This pay increase represented a significant rise from the $350,000 salary that each of the three were paid for the first film. According to Jeffrey Katzenberg, the executive producer of Shrek 2 and a co-founder of DreamWorks, who led the negotiations, the payments were probably the highest in the actors' entire careers. Each of the actors were expected to work between 15 and 18 hours in total. The film was produced with a $70 million budget.

Ted Elliott and Terry Rossio, the screenwriters of the first Shrek film, insisted that the sequel be a traditional fairytale, but after disagreements with the producers, they left the project and were replaced by director Andrew Adamson. His writing of Shrek 2 was inspired by the 1967 comedy-drama film Guess Who's Coming to Dinner, and was completed with the help of the film's co-directors, Kelly Asbury and Conrad Vernon, who spent most of the film's production duration in Northern California while Adamson spent most of his time with the film's voice actors in Glendale, California.

DreamWorks began production of Shrek 2 in 2001, before the first Shrek film was completed. The studio added more human characters to the film than there were in its predecessor and improved character appearance and movement with the use of several new animation/rendering systems. In particular, Puss in Boots necessitated development of a whole new set of film production tools to handle the appearance of his fur, belt, and hat plume; Puss' fur especially required an upgrade to the fur shader. All of the character setup was completed in the first three years of production.

In an early version of Shrek 2, Shrek abdicated the throne, and called for a fairy tale election. Pinocchio's campaign was an "honesty" campaign, while Gingy's was a "smear" campaign. Adamson said that although this plot did have many funny ideas, it was also too overtly satiric and political, and considered "more intellectual than emotional". Shrek 2 also appears much darker in terms of lighting when compared to the original film. Designers reportedly took inspiration from 19th century French illustrator and engraver Gustav Doré to improve the film's richness of detail and setting. According to production designer Guillaume Aretos, "There are a lot of medieval paintings and illustrations [and] my own influences, which are classical paintings from the 15th and 16th centuries...The design of Shrek is always a twist on reality anyway, so we tried to [pack] as much detail and interest as we could in the imagery."

Soundtrack

The soundtrack for Shrek 2 was composed solely by Harry Gregson-Williams, who returned after composing the score for the first Shrek film, marking it as his fifth collaboration with DreamWorks Animation, following Antz (1998), Chicken Run (2000) Shrek (2001), and Sinbad: Legend of the Seven Seas (2003). The soundtrack reached the 8th position on the US Billboard 200 and 1st on the US Soundtracks (Billboard). It also features two versions of the 1980s Bonnie Tyler hit "Holding Out for a Hero".

Release
In April 2004, the film was selected to compete for the Palme d'Or at the 2004 Cannes Film Festival.Shrek 2 was originally scheduled for release on June 18, 2004. The film was then moved forward from June 18, 2004, to May 21, 2004; however, due to "fan demand", it was released two days earlier from May 21, 2004, to May 19, 2004. A day before the film went to theaters, the first five minutes were shown on Nickelodeon's U-Pick Live.

Playing in 4,163 theaters over its first weekend in the United States, Shrek 2 was the first film with over 4,000 theaters in overall count. Over 3,700 theaters was its count for an opening day.

In July 2014, the film's distribution rights were purchased by DreamWorks Animation from Paramount Pictures (owners of the pre-2005 DreamWorks Pictures catalog) and transferred to 20th Century Fox before reverting to Universal Studios in 2018.

Home mediaShrek 2 was released on VHS and DVD on November 5, 2004 and on Game Boy Advance Video on November 17, 2005. It became one of the best-selling DVD releases of all time with over 37 million copies being sold. A 3D-converted version of the film was released exclusively with select Samsung television sets on Blu-ray on December 1, 2010, along with the other three films of the series. A non-3D version was released on December 7, 2010, as part of Shrek: The Whole Story, and a stand-alone Blu-ray/DVD combo pack was released individually on August 30, 2011, along with the other two films of the series. A stand-alone 3D Blu-ray version of the film was released on November 1, 2011. The DVD release features two full-length commentary tracks, one by co-directors Conrad Vernon and Kelly Asbury, and a second by producer Aron Warner and editor Michael Andrews.Shrek 2 was released on Ultra HD Blu-ray on November 22, 2022, by Universal Pictures Home Entertainment.

Far Far Away IdolFar Far Away Idol is a special feature on the DVD and VHS release based on American Idol and guest starring Simon Cowell. Taking place right after Shrek 2 ends, the short features characters from Shrek compete in a sing-off while being judged by Shrek, Fiona, and Cowell.

After the performances, on the DVD release, the viewer gets to pick the winner. If any character besides Shrek, Fiona, Donkey, or Puss is selected, an alternate ending plays where Cowell would refuse to accept the winner and proclaim himself the victor, leaping onto the judging table and performing his "own" rendition of "My Way". At the end of the VHS release, it gives a link to a website where the viewer can vote for their favorite to determine the ultimate winner. DreamWorks Animation announced on November 8, 2004, three days after the DVD and VHS release, that with 750,000 votes cast, the "winner" of the competition was Doris.

Reception

Box office
The film opened at No. 1 with a Friday-to-Sunday total of $108 million, and $129 million since its Wednesday launch, from a then-record 4,163 theaters, for an average of $25,952 per theater over the weekend. At the time Shrek 2s Friday-to-Sunday total was the second-highest opening weekend, only trailing Spider-Mans $114.8 million. In addition, Saturday alone managed to obtain $44.8 million, making it the highest single-day gross at the time, beating Spider-Mans first Saturday gross of $43.6 million. The film remained at No. 1 in its second weekend, expanding to 4,223 theaters, and grossing another $95.6 million over the four-day Memorial Day weekend, narrowly beating out the $85.8 million four-day tally of new opener The Day After Tomorrow. It spent ten weeks in the weekly Top 10, remaining there until July 29, and stayed in theaters for 149 days (roughly twenty-one weeks), closing on November 25, 2004. The film was released in the United Kingdom on July 2, 2004, and topped the country's box office for the next two weekends, before being dethroned by Spider-Man 2.

The film grossed $441.2 million domestically (US and Canada) and $487.5 million in foreign markets for a total of $928.7 million worldwide, making it the highest-grossing film of both 2004 and in its franchise. This also puts the film at 14th on the all-time domestic box office list and 42nd on the worldwide box office list. The film sold an estimated 71,050,900 tickets in the US.

The film also took away the highest worldwide gross made by an animated feature, which was before held by Finding Nemo (2003), although the latter still had a higher overseas-only gross. With DVD sales and Shrek 2 merchandise estimated to total almost $800 million, the film (which was produced with a budget of $150 million) is DreamWorks' most profitable film to date.Shrek 2 remained the highest-grossing animated film worldwide until the release of Toy Story 3 (2010), and held the record for the highest-grossing animated film at the North American box office until the release of Finding Dory (2016) as well as the highest-grossing non-Disney animated film at this box office.

Its critical consensus reads, "It may not be as fresh as the original, but topical humor and colorful secondary characters make Shrek 2 a winner in its own right." Metacritic (which uses a weighted average) assigned Shrek 2 a score of 75 out of 100 based on 40 critics, indicating "generally favorable reviews". Audiences polled by CinemaScore gave the film an average grade of "A" on an A+ to F scale.

Roger Ebert gave the film three out of four stars, saying it is "bright, lively, and entertaining", and Robert Denerstein of Denver Rocky Mountain News called it "sharply funny". James Kendrick of QNetwork praised the plot, calling it "familiar, but funny". J. R. Jones of the Chicago Reader called it "unassailable family entertainment", and similar to the first film. Michael O'Sullivan of The Washington Post called it "better and funnier than the original".

Though he wrote that it is not as good as the first film, Kevin Lally of Film Journal International described it as "inventive and often very funny". Peter Rainer of New York magazine, however, stated the film "manages to undo much of what made its predecessor such a computer-generated joy ride."

Sean Naughton of Complex described it as "one of the best-animated sequels ever".

Accolades Shrek 2 was nominated for the Palme d'Or at the 2004 Cannes Film Festival. It won five awards at the 31st People's Choice Awards: Favorite Animated Movie, Favorite Animated Movie Star for "Donkey" (Eddie Murphy), Favorite Movie Comedy, and Favorite Movie Villain for "Fairy Godmother" (Jennifer Saunders), and Favorite Sequel. It also won a Teen Choice Award in the category of Choice Award Choice Movie – Comedy. The film was nominated at the 3rd Visual Effects Society Awards in the category of "Outstanding Performance by an Animated Character in an Animated Motion Picture."

Along with Shark Tale, the film was nominated for the Academy Award for Best Animated Feature, but lost to The Incredibles. One of the film's songs, "Accidentally in Love" received nominations for the Academy Award for Best Original Song, Golden Globe Award for Best Original Song, and the Grammy Award for Best Song Written for a Motion Picture, Television or Other Visual Media.

In 2008, the American Film Institute nominated the film for its Top 10 Animation Films list.

Other media

Video games

 Shrek 2 (2004)
 Shrek 2 Activity Center: Twisted Fairy Tale Fun (2004)
 Shrek 2: Beg for Mercy (2004)
 Shrek SuperSlam (2005)
 Shrek Smash n' Crash Racing (2006)

 Novels Shrek 2: The Movie Storybook was published by Scholastic in 2004. It was written by Tom Mason and Dan Danko and illustrated by Michael Koelsch.

Sequels and spin-offsShrek 2 has two sequels; they are Shrek the Third and Shrek Forever After. A spin-off film Puss in Boots was released on October 28, 2011, and focuses on the character of Puss in Boots, who was introduced in this film. On November 6, 2018, it was reported by Variety that Chris Meledandri had been tasked to reboot both Shrek and Puss in Boots, with the original cast potentially returning.Puss in Boots: The Last Wish'' was released on December 21, 2022. It is a sequel rather than a reboot.

References

External links
 
  at DreamWorks
 

2004 films
2004 comedy films
2004 computer-animated films
2004 fantasy films
2000s adventure comedy films
2000s American animated films
2000s English-language films
2000s fantasy adventure films
2000s parody films
American adventure comedy films
American buddy comedy films
American children's animated comedy films
American children's animated fantasy films
American computer-animated films
American fantasy adventure films
American fantasy comedy films
American sequel films
Animated buddy films
Animated films about animals
Brothers Grimm
DreamWorks Animation animated films
DreamWorks Pictures films
Fairy tale parody films
Films about curses
Films about shapeshifting
Films about fairies and sprites
Films about potions
Films about royalty
Films based on Puss in Boots
Films directed by Andrew Adamson
Films directed by Conrad Vernon
Films directed by Kelly Asbury
Films produced by Aron Warner
Films produced by John H. Williams
Films scored by Harry Gregson-Williams
Films set in the Middle Ages
Films with screenplays by Andrew Adamson
Films with screenplays by Joe Stillman
Shrek 2
Ogres in animated film
Animated films about dragons
Films set in castles
Film controversies in Israel